These are the Canadian number-one country songs of 1985, per the RPM Country Tracks chart.

See also
 1985 in music
 List of number-one country hits of 1985 (U.S.)

External links
 Read about RPM Magazine at the AV Trust
 Search RPM charts here at Library and Archives Canada

1985 in Canadian music
Canada Country
1985